Stavky is a river in Ukraine, which flows within the Chortkiv Raion of Ternopil Oblast. Right tributary of the river Nichlava from the Dniester basin.

The spring is located near the village of Pastushe. Length 4.80 km. It flows near the Kugutivka tract to Nichlavka.

The Stavky River got its name due to the fact that it flows near the Shmankivsky pond.

Sources
 
 Ставки // Словник гідронімів України / Уклад. І. М. Железняк, А. П. Корепанова, Л. Т. Масенко [та ін.] ; Редкол. : К. К. Цілуйко (голова) та ін. — К. : Наукова думка, 1979. — С. 524.
 Огородник, М. Маловідомий струмок Чортківщини // Чортківський Вісник. — 2018. — № 37—38 (21 вересня). — С. 7. — (Краєзнавство).

Geography of Ternopil Oblast
Rivers of Ukraine